Leucosyrinx sansibarica is a species of sea snail, a marine gastropod mollusk in the family Pseudomelatomidae, the turrids.

References

 1925. Gastropoden der Deutschen Tiefsee-Expedition. In:. Wissenschaftliche Ergebnisse der Deutschen Tiefsee-Expedition II. Teil, vol. 17, No. 2, Gutstav Fischer, Berlin.

External links
 

sansibarica
Gastropods described in 1925